Two ships of the Royal Navy have been named HMS Ard Patrick.

  was an  minesweeping sloop launched in 1918 and sold on 12 August 1920.
  was a requisitioned cargo vessel SS Clan Lamont, commissioned in 1944 and returned to her owners in 1946.

Royal Navy ship names